Ayaueto is the debut studio album by Japanese pop singer Aya Ueto. It was released on March 12, 2003 on Flight Master.

Chart performance
Ayaueto peaked at #4 on the Oricon Daily Albums Chart and debuted at #5 on the Weekly Albums Chart with 28,707 copies sold. The album charted for a total of thirteen weeks and sold over 54,000 copies.

Track listing

Charts and sales

References

2003 debut albums
Aya Ueto albums
Pony Canyon albums